In Tibetan cuisine, cheser mog is rice, with melted yak butter, brown sugar, raisins and salt.

See also
 List of Tibetan dishes

References

Tibetan cuisine
Rice dishes